Huckleberry Finn is a 2010 EP by Duke Special, featuring songs composed by Kurt Weill with lyrics by Maxwell Anderson from an unfinished musical based on Mark Twain's 1884 novel Adventures of Huckleberry Finn. It was released both on its own and as part of a box set entitled The Stage, A Book And The Silver Screen, which also includes the albums Mother Courage and Her Children and The Silent World of Hector Mann.

Track listing
River Chanty
Come in, Mornin'
Apple Jack
This Time Next Year
Catfish Song

External links
Description page on Duke Special's website

References

2010 EPs
Duke Special albums
Works based on Adventures of Huckleberry Finn